Umberto Pusterla (born 21 October 1967) is a former Italian male long-distance runner who competed at 11 editions of the IAAF World Cross Country Championships (from 1986 to 2005).

Biography
He won two medals at the European Cross Country Championships with the national team, and won four national championships at senior level.

References

External links
 

1967 births
Living people
Italian male long-distance runners
Italian male cross country runners